Placement Group B of the 1998 Fed Cup Americas Zone Group I was one of six pools in the Americas Zone Group I of the 1998 Fed Cup. The three teams that placed second in the initial pools competed in a round robin competition.

Brazil vs. Ecuador

Canada vs. Ecuador

Canada vs. Brazil

See also
Fed Cup structure

References

External links
 Fed Cup website

1998 Fed Cup Americas Zone